Paul Fisher (born 19 January 1951) is an English former footballer who played in the Football League for Darlington. A full back, Fisher began his senior career with Huddersfield Town, but never played for them in the league, and went on to play non-league football for Stevenage Athletic.

Fisher made three senior appearances for Darlington: he made his debut in the starting eleven for the opening match of the 1970–71 Football League season, a 1–1 draw away to Barrow in the Fourth Division, and played twice more, both in the League in September 1970.

References

1951 births
Living people
Footballers from Mansfield
English footballers
Association football defenders
Huddersfield Town A.F.C. players
Darlington F.C. players
Stevenage Athletic F.C. players
English Football League players